Le Marais de Lavours is a French nature reserve of , it spans the communes of Culoz, Béon, Ceyzérieu, Flaxieu and Pollieu; in Ain, southeastern France. The reserve was created on 22 March 1984.

References

Geography of Ain
Nature reserves in France
Protected areas established in 1984